Fort Richardson may refer to:
Fort Richardson (Alaska) near Anchorage
Fort Richardson (Texas) in Jacksboro
Fort Richardson (Arlington, Virginia) near Washington, D.C.